"Another Part of Me" is a song by American recording artist Michael Jackson. Produced by Quincy Jones (and co-produced by Jackson), it was released as the sixth single on July 11, 1988, for the singer's seventh studio album, Bad (1987). The song was originally featured in Jackson's 1986 3D film Captain EO. It is the sixth song on the album. As with earlier songs in his career such as "Can You Feel It" and "We Are the World", the lyrics emphasize global unity, love and outreach. 

The song was featured in the trailer for Jackson's 1988 film Moonwalker, and was featured as a dance attack and level song for the later revisions of Michael Jackson's Moonwalker video game (originally the first revision used excerpts of Thriller). The song was also featured in the 1998 movie Rush Hour during a score with Chris Tucker dancing.

In July 2009, a short part of the song was used by singer Madonna as a tribute during the second leg of her Sticky & Sweet Tour. A Jackson impersonator performed his signature moves, while dancing to a medley of Jackson's songs.

Background
According to Quincy Jones in an interview that was featured in the 2001 special edition of Bad, Jackson wanted to include "Streetwalker" instead of "Another Part of Me". However, as Quincy Jones said “ Michael liked ‘Streetwalker’, and I wanted to do ‘Another Part of Me’…he wrote both of them, so it didn’t make any difference to him….we were going to listen to them, the three of us, objectively and decide which one was gonna get picked. And so [Manager Frank] DiLeo was sitting down when ‘Streetwalker’ was on, and when “Another Part Of Me” came on, he got up with his fat ass, you know, and started [dancing]. I said, ‘You’re not helping Michael at all!’ It was so funny – Michael had a funny name for him, like, ‘Rubber…what are you doin’ man, you just blew my whole case here!’ So DiLeo helped me get ‘Another Part’ cause he started shaking his butt on it” and ‘Another Part of Me’ featured instead. "Streetwalker" was later released on the 2001 special edition and the second disc of 25th anniversary re-issue.

Music video
An official video was released in 1988, directed by Patrick Kelly, featuring Jackson performing the song live during his Bad World Tour. The film footage was taken on July 22 at Wembley Stadium with soundtrack mixed from live multitrack recording taken on July 15 (while the drum multitrack is from July 16), with additional footage from June 27–28 show at Parc des Princes in Paris as well as some footage from Volksparkstadion in Hamburg on July 1st. It is featured on the DVD Michael Jackson's Vision and the Target version DVD of Bad 25.

Track listing
7" single
 Another Part of Me (Single Mix) – 3:46
 Another Part of Me (Instrumental) – 3:46

12" single / Picture Disc – CD Maxi
 Another Part of Me (Extended Dance Mix) – 6:18
 Another Part of Me (Radio Edit) – 4:24
 Another Part of Me (Dub Mix) – 3:51
 Another Part of Me (A Cappella) – 4:01

Promo CD Single (United States)
 Another Part of Me (Single Mix)
 Another Part of Me (Extended Dance Mix)
 Another Part of Me (Radio Edit)
 Another Part of Me (Dub Mix)
 Another Part of Me (A Cappella)

Personnel
 Written and composed by Michael Jackson
 Produced by Quincy Jones
 Co-Produced by Michael Jackson
 Michael Jackson: solo and background vocals
 Paul Jackson, Jr., David Williams: guitars
 Kim Hutchcroft, Larry Williams: saxophones
 Gary Grant, Jerry Hey: trumpets
 Christopher Currell: Synclavier
 John Barnes, Rhett Lawrence: synthesizers
 Rhythm and vocal arrangements by Michael Jackson and John Barnes
 Horn arrangement by Jerry Hey

Charts

Weekly charts

Year-end charts

References

1987 songs
1988 singles
Epic Records singles
Michael Jackson songs
Song recordings produced by Michael Jackson
Song recordings produced by Quincy Jones
Songs written by Michael Jackson